The 2012 Tampere Open was a professional tennis tournament played on hard courts. It was the 31st edition of the tournament which was part of the 2012 ATP Challenger Tour. It took place in Tampere, Finland between 23 and 29 July 2012.

Singles main-draw entrants

Seeds

 1 Rankings are as of July 16, 2012.

Other entrants
The following players received wildcards into the singles main draw:
  Micke Kontinen
  Henri Laaksonen
  Henrik Sillanpää
  Max Wennakoski

The following players received entry from the qualifying draw:
  Alexandre Folie
  Petru-Alexandru Luncanu
  Yannik Reuter
  Patrik Rosenholm

Champions

Singles

 João Sousa def.  Éric Prodon, 7–6(7–5), 6–4

Doubles

 Michael Linzer /  Gerald Melzer def.  Niels Desein /  André Ghem, 6–1, 7–6(7–3)

External links
Official website

Tampere Open
Tampere Open